Rose al Yusuf may refer to:
 Rose al Yusuf (1898–1958), a Lebanese-born Egyptian actress and journalist
 Rose al-Yūsuf, an Arabic weekly political magazine published in Egypt